James Bourne, also known as Solo  is a fictional character, appearing in American comic books published by Marvel Comics. The character first appeared in Web of Spider-Man #19 in October 1986 and was created by writer David Michelinie and artist Marc Silvestri.

A former citizen of the United States who renounced his citizenship, Solo works as a bodyguard and counter-terrorism operative. He is a master hand-to-hand combatant and expert marksman, and utilises a range of conventional weapons, although he also possesses limited teleportation abilities, allowing him to "jump" from place to place for short distances. He is known for his catchphrase, "While Solo lives, terror dies!"

Publication history

Solo first appeared in Web of Spider-Man #19 (October 1986). He was created by writer David Michelinie and artist Marc Silvestri.

Solo has had his own self-titled 4-issue limited series in 1994, which guest-starred Spider-Man.

After appearing in Deadpool and the Mercs for Money, he was given a second 5-issue limited series in 2016.

Fictional character biography
Born in the United States but having renounced his citizenship to any country, Solo works as a counter-terrorism operative, and makes limited appearances in the Marvel Comics universe. He is known for his catchphrase, "While Solo lives, terror dies!"

In his first appearance, Solo teleported inside a foreign embassy in West Germany and killed all the terrorists inside. He next foiled ULTIMATUM's plot to destroy the Arc de Triomphe in Paris. He also shot ULTIMATUM terrorists who were trying to destroy Ellis Island, and then joined forces with Spider-Man to capture ULTIMATUM's commanding officer. Outside Barcelona, Spain, Solo assassinated Toro Mendoza, leader of the Cascan separatists.

When the Sinister Six reform and defeat both Spider-Man and the Hulk, Solo aids the web-slinger in his second fight against the super villain team. Things take a turn for the worse when Mysterio uses an illusion to make Solo believe he is attacking the Six, when in reality he is attacking Spider-Man while the Six escape. Solo escapes and Spider-Man is rescued by Cyborg X and Deathlok. Soon after, Solo rejoins Spider-Man to aid him in a final assault on the Six aided by the Hulk, Ghost Rider, Sleepwalker, Nova, Deathlok and the Fantastic Four. With the villains defeated, Solo disappears.

Solo later fought La Tarantula. He defeated a Sicilian crime syndicate, and then joined forces with Spider-Man against the agents of the Taskmaster and the Red Skull. A rematch with La Tarantula ended with each combatant wrongly believing he had killed the other. Solo then joined forces with Black Cat against the terrorist organization called ARES, and stopped their money laundering operation. He encountered their leader Deathstorm who revealed he had ties with Solo's past. Solo later joined forces with Nick Fury against the Viper.

Solo also once helped Spider-Man take on criminally-trained specialist versions of Captain America, Hawkeye, and Spider-Man himself.

Later, Solo assists dozens of other heroes in battling a seemingly rampaging Wolverine (he was being mentally influenced). He confronts Wolverine, side-by-side with Cardiac. Solo is swiftly defeated, suffering deep lacerations in the process. Cardiac is subdued by falling masonry.

Solo is hired by G. W. Bridge to join the new Six Pack alongside Hammer, Domino, Anaconda, and Constrictor in their mission to take down Cable. Like Bridge and Hammer, Solo is captured and placed in suspended animation. He is eventually released.

During the "Civil War" storyline, Solo sides with other heroes who oppose registration, including Battlestar and Typeface. While waiting to make contact with the resistance led by Captain America, Solo and the others are arrested by Iron Man, Ms. Marvel, Wonder Man and S.H.I.E.L.D. agents.

Solo has been identified as one of the 142 registered superheroes. Solo was hired along with Clay, as bodyguards to protect Wally and Molly, cheery twins who sing anti-Mutant hate-songs. They chained up M, tied up Siryn and taped her mouth shut, and locked both women in a desert bunker after they tried to round two kids up in order to enforce the kids grandparents' court granted visitation rights.

During the "Dark Reign" storyline, Solo was hired by a man later revealed to be Bullseye's father to capture Bullseye. Bullseye threw a shard of glass into Solo's left eye, but Solo survived and managed to capture Bullseye after tasering him. The assassins chasing Elektra attempt to hire Solo to assist but fail.

Following the eight month ellipsis after the "Secret Wars" storyline, Solo is seen as part of Deadpool's new Mercs for Money. He attempts to steal a classified drive in Seoul, and ends up in a fight with the Korean heroine White Fox. Solo takes a specific interest in Deadpool's morality, such as when he urges him to destroy a robot whose knowledge of the future threatens innocent lives.

During the "Iron Man 2020" event, Solo appears as a member of Force Works. During a raid on a robot hideout, one of the robots self-destructs when cornered by War Machine and Gauntlet. Maria Hill mentioned to War Machine that Solo quit because he felt that War Machine was not teammate material.

Powers and abilities
Solo has somewhat limited teleportation abilities, allowing him to "jump" from place to place for short distances. There appears to be a limit to the distance and the amount of time between Solo's teleports. He has a gifted intellect, and is a master of many forms of hand-to-hand combat. He is highly adept in the use of conventional weapons and firearms and is an expert marksman.

Solo wears bullet-proof quilted Kevlar with pouches to hold weapons and ammunition. He carries an arsenal of portable conventional weaponry, including sub-machine guns, automatic rifles, automatic pistols, hand grenades, combat knives, etc., and has been known to use ninja climbing claws.

Collected editions

References

External links
 Solo Profile on the official Marvel Website

Comics characters introduced in 1986
Characters created by David Michelinie
Characters created by Marc Silvestri
Fictional bodyguards
Fictional gunfighters in comics
Fictional marksmen and snipers
Fictional mercenaries in comics
Marvel Comics characters who can teleport
Marvel Comics superheroes
Spider-Man characters
Vigilante characters in comics